Nawton is the name of at least two places:

Nawton, North Yorkshire, an English village
Nawton, New Zealand, a suburb of Hamilton